Anthony Bannon (born December 6, 1943) is an arts administrator in Western New York. He served as the director of the George Eastman Museum from 1996 to 2012 as well as the executive director of the Burchfield Penney Art Center at Buffalo State College. During his tenure at the George Eastman Museum, Bannon launched programs in photo and film preservation, acquired the Technicolor and Merchant Ivory Productions archives, and established an online presence for the museum's classic images.

Bannon has lectured at museums, colleges, and festivals worldwide. He currently serves as chairman of the Lucie Awards/International Photography Awards and was awarded the Golden Career Award in 2007 by the FOTOfusion Festival of Photography & Digital Imaging for his “far-reaching leadership and scholarship in the cultural community.”

Biography

Education 
Bannon studied biology at St. Bonaventure University, earning a bachelor's degree in 1964. He earned a master's degree in English, with a concentration in criticism and film in the Center for Media Study, from the State University of New York at Buffalo in 1976.
Bannon earned his Ph.D. in 1994 from the State University of New York at Buffalo from the English Department, with a concentration in Culture Studies. His thesis was titled Robert Longo: A Practice of Art.

Director of the George Eastman Museum 
The George Eastman Museum combines the world's leading collections of photography and film with the stately pleasures of the Colonial Revival mansion and gardens that Eastman Kodak Company founder George Eastman called home from 1905 to 1932. Eastman is heralded as the father of popular photography and motion picture film.

The Eastman Museum, which opened to the public as a museum in 1949, has collections that include 400,000 photographs by 9,000 photographers, from the earliest daguerreotypes to the most recent digital images; 20,000 items of camera technology; 30,000 motion picture titles and 3.5 million publicity stills and posters; and one of the world's most comprehensive libraries of photographic books, manuscripts, and journals. The Eastman Museum also has as an acquisition program of contemporary works.

In modern archives and galleries adjacent to the National Historic Landmark home and gardens, the museum offer programs in film and photograph preservation. The L. Jeffrey Selznick School of Film Preservation offers a master's degree in film preservation in conjunction with the University of Rochester. The Eastman Museum and the University of Rochester also jointly offer a master's degree program in Photograph Preservation and Collections Management.

Filmmakers who deposit their films at Eastman House include Martin Scorsese (a personal collection of 8,000 titles), Spike Lee, and Ken Burns.

Comments about the George Eastman Museum during Bannon's tenure:
“The nation’s leading photography museum.” —William Bulkeley, The Wall Street Journal 

“George Eastman House is at the forefront of what I consider to be one of the most important tasks of our time — the preservation of film as part of our national heritage.”  —  Martin Scorsese, filmmaker
	
“If you have never seen a classic photograph in the raw, you are missing a wonderful experience . . . the jaw-dropping, pulse-racing, imagination-capturing capital of it all is the George Eastman House in Rochester, New York.” — John Owens, editor in chief, Popular Photography 

“A national treasure . . . a first-rate modern museum that no lover of photography will want to miss.” — Susan Adams, senior editor, Forbes

“George Eastman House is among the holy places of cinema, where films are loved and preserved.” — Roger Ebert, film critic

Early career 
Bannon began his career as a journalist, working from 1966 to 1985 for The Buffalo News, a metropolitan daily with a peak circulation of more than 400,000. He initially served as a theater and dance critic, and was a critic fellow at the Eugene O'Neill Memorial Theater Foundation and the American Dance Congress in 1969. Bannon later served as the newspaper's film, video, and architecture critic, finally concentrating on the fine and camera arts from 1977 through 1985. When a Sunday edition was initiated in 1977, he was appointed its art section editor. Reflecting Buffalo’s long-standing tradition of civic commitment to culture, the Buffalo News encouraged Bannon to teach, to make films, to serve as a dramaturg for theater productions, and to organize exhibitions in the visual arts.

For the next decade, from 1985 to 1996, Bannon was with the State University of New York College at Buffalo. He served as director of the Burchfield-Penney Art Center, which is dedicated to the work and archives of Charles Burchfield (1893–1967), an American watercolorist. The center holds the largest collection of Burchfield works, journals and ephemera. It also serves as a regional museum, collecting art, craft and design by artists who have lived in Western New York State, including the largest collection of Roycroft objects from the Arts and Crafts Movement. The center is the repository of the Charles Rand Penney Collections. As a presenting organization, the Burchfield-Penney programs in all the visual arts, including architecture, design, film, video, craft and folk art, as well as literary arts and music.
 
Bannon additionally held the position of the college's assistant vice president and director for cultural affairs from 1994 to 1996. The Office of Cultural Affairs developed and advanced faculty, student and staff talent by locating, encouraging, assisting and presenting examples of intellectual and creative excellence from the college community. The objective of the office, established by Bannon, was to develop and sponsor collaborations across disciplines, often with organizations and individuals off campus, and to develop associations for the Foreign Exchange Program (particularly with the Latvian Academy of Fine Art and the Fachhochschule in Dortmund, Germany). 
Bannon's teaching experience has included adjunct positions at Sierra Nevada College in Nevada; State University of New York College at Buffalo; Empire State College in Buffalo; and Rochester Institute of Technology.

Personal 
Bannon is married with four adult children.

Bannon was born in Hanover, New Hampshire, where his father, Dr. Robert Bannon, was a professor of physiological optics and a member of the Dartmouth Eye Institute, and his mother, Frances, was a nurse at Hitchcock Memorial Hospital.

Awards and grants 
CEO of the Year, Public Relations Society of America, Rochester Chapter, 2008
Golden Career Award, FOTOfusion Festival of Photography & Digital Imaging, 2007
University Arts Award, St. Bonaventure University, 2002
Outstanding Art Administrator of the Year, The Buffalo Partnership (Chamber of Commerce) and the Arts Council of Buffalo & Erie County, 1995
Gallaudet College Award for Excellence in Writing About Deafness, 1985
Merit Award For The Photo-Pictorialists of Buffalo American Photographic Historical Society, 1982
Videospace Experiment Grant, With Ed Emshwiller and Bob O. Lehmann A New York State Arts Council grant, administered by Media Study/Buffalo and WNED-Public Television, to make “Positive/Negative Electronic Faces” (With Emshwiller) and “UB/More To Come” (With Lehmann), 1973–74
Bunis Award for Best Article in Western New York State Magazine, 1972
American Association of Commerce Publications Best Feature Story, 1970

Publications
Hiroshi Watanabe: Findings, 2007 Critical Mass/Photolucida
Warheads: Photographs by Diane Bush, 2006 KuDaEditions, USA 
Picturing Eden, Introduction, 2005 Steidl, Germany
Steve McCurry (Phaidon 55s), 2005 Phaidon Press, London, United Kingdom 
Ansel Adams, 2003 Fundación Pedro Barrié de al Maza, A Coruña, Spain 
Arcadia Revisited: Photographs by John Pfahl, 1988, with Estelle Jussim University of New Mexico Press
Grace Woodworth: Photographer Outside the Common Lines, 1984, with Mary Stanley Schweinfurth Memorial Art Center, Auburn, New York
The Taking of Niagara: A History of the Falls in Photography, 1982 Media Study/Buffalo, New York
The Photo-Pictorialists of Buffalo, 1981 Media Study/Buffalo with the Albright-Knox Art Gallery, Buffalo, New York

References

1943 births
Living people
Directors of museums in the United States
Directors of George Eastman House
St. Bonaventure University alumni
University at Buffalo alumni
Sierra Nevada College
People from Hanover, New Hampshire